The 2004–05 Northern Premier League season was the 37th in the history of the Northern Premier League, a football competition in England. Teams were divided into two divisions; the Premier and the First. This was the first Northern Premier League system after the creation of Conference North and Conference South

Premier Division 

Due to a restructuring of the league system in which the new leagues Conference North and Conference South, the league featured 14 new teams promoted from Division One:

 Bamber Bridge
 Bishop Auckland
 Bridlington Town
 Farsley Celtic
 Gateshead
 Guiseley
 Hyde United promoted as champions of Division One
 Leek Town
 Lincoln United
 Matlock Town
 Ossett Town
 Prescot Cables
 Witton Albion
 Workington

League table

Results

Play-offs 
The Premier Division play-offs saw the second to fifth placed sides in the Division compete for one place in the Conference North.

* After extra time

Division One 

Division One featured 14 new teams due to the creation of Conference North and Conference South:

 Rocester from the Midland Football Alliance
 Willenhall Town from the Midland Football Alliance
 Brigg Town from the Northern Counties East League Premier Division
 Eastwood Town from the Northern Counties East League Premier Division
 Ossett Albion from the Northern Counties East League Premier Division
 Spalding United from the United Counties League Premier Division
 Clitheroe from the North West Counties League Division One
 Mossley from the North West Counties League Division One
 Warrington Town from the North West Counties League Division One
 Woodley Sports from the North West Counties League Division One
 Gresley Rovers from the Southern League Western Division
 Ilkeston Town from the Southern League Western Division
 Shepshed Dynamo from the Southern League Western Division
 A.F.C. Telford United as a new club

League table

Results

Play-offs 
The First Division play-offs saw the third to sixth placed sides in the First Division compete for a place in the Premier Division.

Promotion and relegation 
In the thirty-seventh season of the Northern Premier League Hyde United were promoted as champions while Workington were promoted as play-off winners, where they would both be promoted to the Conference North. Bishop Aukland, Bridlington Town, Bamber Bridge and Spennymoor United were relegated to the First Division; these four clubs were replaced by relegated Conference North sides Runcorn Halton, Ashton United and Bradford Park Avenue. First Division winners North Ferriby United, second placed Ilkeston Town and play-off winners A.F.C. Telford United were all promoted to the Premier Division. In the First Division Rocester were relegated and were replaced by Goole and Fleetwood Town.

Cup Results
Challenge Cup: Teams from both leagues.

Matlock Town 2–2 (3–1 Pens) Whitby Town

President's Cup: 'Plate' competition for losing teams in the NPL Cup.

Bamber Bridge 1–1 2–1 (3–2 agg.) Witton Albion

Chairman's Cup: 'Plate' competition for losing teams in the NPL Cup.

Kidsgrove Athletic 3–3 4–3 (7–6 agg.) Woodley Sports

Peter Swales Shield: Between Champions of NPL Premier Division and Winners of the NPL Cup.

Hyde United bt. Matlock Town

2005 Northern Premier League Controversy

NPL meeting
The end of this season saw Spennymoor United fail to fulfil nine of their league fixtures after folding. The Northern Premier League's Board of Directors met on 24 April 2005 to consider how these unplayed games would be treated in the fairest possible manner to all Premier Division member clubs. At this meeting it was decided to expunge the record of Spennymoor United from the table. Subsequent to this meeting the member clubs of Gateshead, Radcliffe Borough, Hyde United and Workington appealed to the Football Association (the FA) against the decision.

One of the grounds of appeal was that the meeting did not have a quorum and the FA recommended that the Northern Premier League withdraw their decision to expunge the record of Spennymoor United from the table and for the issue to be considered by a meeting that had a quorum.

Second board meeting
At the emergency board meeting held on 1 May 2005, the Board of the Northern Premier Football League confirmed their decision to expunge Spennymoor United's playing record. This meeting came a day after the final day of the Northern Premier League Premier Division season where Workington had finished in first place, Hyde United in second (having played 41 games to Workington and Farsley's 42) and Farsley in third. The confirmation to expunge Spennymoor United's playing record then saw Farsley finish in first place, Hyde United finish in second and Workington finish in third.

Gateshead, Hyde United, Radcliffe Borough and Workington followed up their appeal to the FA and on 4 May 2005 the FA overturned the Northern Premier League Board's decision to expunge the playing record of Spennymoor United. The FA ruled that the Northern Premier League was bound by an undertaking, duly minuted at its management committee meeting in January 2005, that Spennymoor United would not be expelled, nor its record for the season expunged.

The FA decided that Spennymoor United’s playing record would re-instated into the league records and, in addition, three points would be awarded to other teams for each game outstanding against Spennymoor United, although no goals for or against will be allocated. Hyde United were one of the teams awarded three points which awarded them the 2004–05 Northern Premier League Premier Division Championship.

Farsley Celtic celebrated winning the Championship on the last day of the season, ignoring the fact that the original meeting on 24 April 2005 did not have a quorum however, as a result of the new overruling finished third in the table. Burscough, who had slipped from fifth to sixth, and out of the final promotion playoff place, thanks to Prescot Cables being awarded six points due to their two unplayed games against Spennymoor United, were aggrieved by this decision and, on 11 May 2005, attempted to get the FA to go to arbitration. This was rejected outright by the FA, and so Farsley Celtic and Burscough attempted to get the FA Appeal Board decision on 4 May overturned by the High Court of Justice in London on 12 May 2005.

Conclusive finding
On 13 May 2005 the FA and the Northern Premier League confirmed that Hyde United were the champions of the Northern Premier League Premier Division, and were presented with the trophy at their end of season party by Northern Premier League Chairman, Duncan Bayley.

Workington, who had finished first on the last day of the season having played a game more than Hyde United, were promoted along with Hyde United having beaten Farsley Celtic in a penalty shootout in the play-off final.

References

External links 
 Unibond Football League 2004–05 Tables
 Northern Premier League Tables at RSSSF

Northern Premier League seasons
7